Rafael Rodríguez  may refer to:

 Rafael Lucas Rodríguez (1915–1981), Costa Rican biologist, botanist, and artist
 Rafael Rodríguez Barrera (1937–2011), Mexican politician and diplomat
 Rafael Rodriguez (boxer) (born 1946), retired US light middleweight boxer
 Rafael Rodríguez (judo) (born 1959), Cuban judoka
 Rafael Rodríguez Mercado (born 1961), Puerto Rican neurosurgeon and politician
 Rafael Rodríguez Vargas (active since 1998), Puerto Rican politician and senator
 Rafael Rodríguez (referee), El Salvadoran football referee in 1999 UNCAF Nations Cup and 2000 CONCACAF Gold Cup
 Rafael Rodríguez (cyclist) (born 1981), Spanish competitive cyclist in the Contentpolis-Ampo team
 Rafael Rodríguez (pitcher) (born 1956), Cuban National League pitcher
 Rafael Rodríguez (baseball) (born 1984), Major League Baseball pitcher
 Rafael Rodríguez (sport shooter) (born 1952), Cuban sports shooter
 Felo Rodríguez, Cuban baseball player